USS Chowanoc (ATF-100) was an Abnaki-class of fleet ocean tug. It was named after an Indian tribe of the same name.

Service history
World War 2:

Worked on the Marianas operation, with the Capture and occupation of Saipan from 3 to 10 August 1944. worked on the capture and occupation of Guam from 3 to 15 August 1944. Working on the Luzon operation in the Lingayen Gulf landings from 9 to 18 January 1945. Worked on the Leyte operation in the Leyte landings from 20 to 22 November 1944.

Korean War:
Worked in Korean in the 1952 and 1953.

Vietnam War:
Worked in the Vietnamese Counteroffensive from 9 to 12 April 1966. Worked in the Vietnamese Counteroffensive - Phase II from 28 July to 1 August 1966. Worked in the Vietnamese Counteroffensive - Phase V from 8 to 10 October 1968. Worked in the Vietnamese Counteroffensive - Phase VI from 10 to 17 November 1968, 29 November to 5 December 1968 and 12 December 1968 to 11 January 1969. Serviced in the Vietnamese Counteroffensive - Phase VII from 19 to 22 May 1971, 7 to 23 January 1973 and 21 February to 21 March 1973.

 Chowanoc was sold to the Ecuadorian Navy on 1 October 1977 under the Security Assistance Program and renamed BAE Chimborazo (RA-70).

On 2 March 2020, Chimborazo was quarantined for two weeks at Guayaquil South Naval Base after a member of its 50-person crew was discovered to have been in contact with someone infected with COVID-19.

Historical significance
It is notable as being the last ship served on by Richard Benjamin Harrison of Pawn Stars.

References

Abnaki-class tugs
1943 ships
Ships built in Charleston, South Carolina
Ships transferred from the United States Navy to the Ecuadorian Navy
Auxiliary ships of the Ecuadorian Navy
Naval ships involved in the COVID-19 pandemic